The Embassy of Guinea in Washington, D.C. is the Republic of Guinea's diplomatic mission to the United States. It is located at 2112 Leroy Place Northwest, Washington, D.C., in the Kalorama neighborhood.

The Ambassador is Blaise Chérif.

References

External links
wikimapia

Guinea
Washington, D.C.
Guinea–United States relations